The Chemehuevi Wash is a large wash of northeast San Bernardino County in the southeast Mojave Desert. The wash enters the center-west bank of Lake Havasu on the California–Arizona border. Chemehuevi Wash drains the center of the Chemehuevi Valley and the regional landforms of washes, valleys and mountains is adjacent the northeast region of the Colorado Desert, the entire region south on the west side of the south-flowing  Colorado River.

Description
The 35-mile (56 km) long Chemehuevi Wash drains the center of Chemehuevi Valley; it begins southwest of the center of the Sacramento Mountains, with the water divide separating the northwest draining Ward Valley, a southwest tributary to the Piute Wash region west and northwest of  Needles. The Chemehuevi Wash and Valley drain southeasterly, then turn due east for about 12 miles.

The Colorado River then continues mostly south, but again makes other turns before reaching the north of the Gulf of California.

Stepladder Mountains Wilderness
The Stepladder Mountains Wilderness, (Stepladder Mountains), is located in the center of Chemehuevi Valley, near the wash source regions in the northwest.

Watersheds
The Chemehuevi Wash Watershed is south of the Piute Wash of southeast Nevada and California. The watershed is a western tributary to the Havasu-Mohave Lakes Watershed.

References

External links

Havasu-Mohave Lakes Watershed
Piute Wash Watershed, Nevada to California

Washes of California
Tributaries of the Lower Colorado River in California
Rivers of San Bernardino County, California
Rivers of Southern California